Acanthopsyche cana is a moth of the family Psychidae first described by George Hampson in 1892. It is found in India and Sri Lanka.

Larval host plants are Cocos nucifera, Elaeis guineensis, Hevea brasiliensis and Punica granatum.

References

Moths of Asia
Moths described in 1892
Psychidae